FreeGEM released in 1999 is a windowing system based on Digital Research's GEM which was first released in 1985. GEM stands for "Graphics Environment Manager".

Overview
FreeGEM is the free software/open source version of GEM developed after Caldera Thin Clients released the GEM code under the terms of the GNU GPL-2.0-only free software license in April 1999. Caldera Thin Clients owned the source code to GEM through Caldera's purchase of the remaining Digital Research assets from Novell on 23 July 1996, who had acquired Digital Research in June 1991.

FreeGEM code works on almost every version of DOS, and runs on almost every IBM compatible PC. One can download all the FreeGEM binaries and source code in one package through the OpenGEM SDK. The OpenGEM SDK also contains language bindings, documentation, and compilers. There are additional FreeGEM resources available through John C. Elliott's GEM website.

OpenGEM is a popular FreeGEM distribution. Other distributions include Owen's FreeGEM Distribution.

OpenGEM
OpenGEM is a non-multitasking 16-bit graphical user interface (GUI) for DOS. It is an extended distribution of FreeGEM that includes features of the original Digital Research GEM.

OpenGEM is intended to provide a simple to install and use GUI system and windowing framework for the FreeDOS operating system.

Caldera Thin Clients (later known as Lineo), who owned the source code to GEM through Caldera's purchase of the remaining Digital Research assets from Novell on 23 July 1996, released the source to GEM under the terms of GPL-2.0-only in April 1999. OpenGEM was developed by Shane Martin Coughlan in collaboration with the FreeGEM Developer team, and is free software released under the terms of the GPL-2.0-only. OpenGEM versions 3 through 6 are hosted on SourceForge and on the FreeDOS website.

OpenGEM has not been actively developed since 2008 but is feature-complete as a basic GUI and includes a full SDK for future third-party development or extension.

Compatibility 
OpenGEM works with FreeDOS Beta 9 and above, DR DOS 5.0 and above, MS-DOS 3.3 and above, PC DOS 3.3 and above, REAL/32, and DOSBox 0.65. OpenGEM will function on Windows 95, Windows 98, Windows 98SE, and Windows ME. It is not known to work with Windows NT, Windows 2000 and Windows XP or later.

See also 

 ViewMAX
 QEMU
 GEM character set

References

External links
 GEM Development mailing list 
 John C. Elliott's GEM site
 FreeGEM file site
 Owen's FreeGEM Distribution
 OpenGEM on the FreeDOS site
 OpenGEM on Github
 OpenGEM on the SourceForge site
 

1985 software
DOS software
File managers
Free windowing systems
GEM software
Windowing systems